Thierry Jean Bernard Robert (born 1 April 1977) is a French politician who was elected to the French National Assembly on 17 June 2012 representing the Department of Réunion.

He has been the mayor of Saint-Leu since 2008.

References

External links
Official site of Thierry Robert

1977 births
Living people
Mayors of places in Réunion
People from Saint-Denis, Réunion
Black French politicians
Deputies of the 14th National Assembly of the French Fifth Republic
Deputies of the 15th National Assembly of the French Fifth Republic
Democratic Movement (France) politicians

Members of Parliament for Réunion